Reno Pops Orchestra is an all volunteer community orchestra  founded in 1982, based in  Reno, Nevada.  The orchestra is composed of over 65 musicians ranging in age from 11 to 90, including professional musicians, semi-professional musicians, as well as working and retired individuals and students.

The Orchestra is supported by Annual Memberships, grants and generous private donations.  The Orchestra performs five to seven free concerts per year, bringing classical and pops music to communities in Northern Nevada and Northeastern California.

External links
  Reno Pops Orchestra

Culture of Reno, Nevada
Pops orchestras
Performing arts in Nevada